All Star Extravaganza was a professional wrestling event, held annually by the Ring of Honor (ROH) promotion. In 2014, it became an annual live pay-per-view (PPV) for Ring of Honor, taking place in September.

Dates and venues

See also 
ROH's annual events

References

External links 
 Ring of Honor's official site

Ring of Honor shows
Recurring events established in 2002
Recurring events disestablished in 2016
2002 establishments in Pennsylvania
2016 disestablishments in Massachusetts